Vincent Atingah Adae (born 30 October 1993) is a Ghanaian footballer who currently plays as a defender for Ghana premier League side   Medeama. SC

Career statistics

Club

Notes

International

International goals
Scores and results list Ghana's goal tally first.

References

External links

1993 births
Living people
Ghanaian footballers
Ghanaian expatriate footballers
Association football defenders
Ghana Premier League players
Kategoria Superiore players
Accra Hearts of Oak S.C. players
KF Tirana players
Qadsia SC players
Ghanaian expatriate sportspeople in Albania
Ghanaian expatriate sportspeople in Kuwait
Expatriate footballers in Albania
Expatriate footballers in Kuwait
Ghana international footballers
Kuwait Premier League players
Al-Shabab SC (Kuwait) players